Graystone Pines is a condominium building located at 2730 Highland Drive, Salt Lake City, Utah, United States. It was built in 1960 and was the first condominium built in the United States. Keith Romney acted as legal counsel for the building developers.

References

External links
 Greystone Manor on Condopedia

Residential condominiums in the United States
1960 establishments in Utah
Residential buildings completed in 1960
Residential buildings in Salt Lake City